Gerry Miller may refer to:

Gerry Miller, character in Kaleidoscope Man played by Ian Reddington
Gerry Miller, leader of the development of Boeing X-53 Active Aeroelastic Wing
Gerry Miller (educator) on National Broadband Task Force
Gerry Miller (actor) in The Deadliest Season

See also
Jerry Miller (disambiguation)
Gerald Miller (disambiguation)